, better known simply as True Love, is a Japanese erotic visual novel dating simulation game developed by Software House Parsley and published by CD Bros., released on June 9, 1995, for the PC-98 and on December 6, 1996, for Windows. It was localized in Europe by Otaku Publishing and distributed in North America by JAST USA in January 1999.

Gameplay

Unlike traditional, even modern visual novels, which are characteristically uninvolved beyond the periodic decision to make, True Love incorporates elements reminiscent of a role-playing game.

The game is played through a series of virtual days, consecutively spanning three months. At the start of each morning, players designate an activity to pursue for evening, night, and in the case of weekends or vacation, daytime: studying, practicing art, exercising, grooming, recreation, taking a break, going to work, shopping or fulfilling a promise. Each choice affects the overall being of the player at the conclusion of the day, and points are distributed among stats for passion, appearance, fatigue, scholarship, strength and art. Depending on the level of these stats, and the order of schedules made during particular days, the player will shift their romantic focus and possibly trigger nonlinear events and encounters over time. In addition, working generates income and shopping allows the player to voluntarily spend their money on items for themselves or to give as gifts.

Plot

The main character is a single, nineteen-year-old Japanese college senior living in the fictional city of Meiai, forced out by his parents at the idea that independence may attract him a partner. On top of his quest to find a girlfriend, he is also indecisive about what direction to go in his academics. The player can choose any name for the character (the default name is Daisuke).

Characters

Mikae Morikawa
The player's childhood friend who met him in kindergarten; now an adolescent co-ed attending the same college as him with a less than platonic eye. Although she can be meddlesome, Mikae is the most down-to-earth, well-rounded of girls to court with no overall preferences.

Kazuhiko Miyoshi
The player's closest if not best friend. He enjoys video games and is quite knowledgeable, especially about the girls who populate the college. He has a younger sister named Arisa.

Chiemi Fujimoto
The second girl to encounter. She is the captain of the girls swim team. Athletic to the core, Chiemi is a robust, competitive, steadfast character with a love for exercise and a fear of caterpillars.

Yumi Matsumiya
One of the college's professors, principally the player's. With a history for low grades and procrastination, she takes deep concern for his academic development in her classes, counseling him to maintain his studies and do his homework. Single, and much to her confusion, she takes a more than comfortable attraction to him.

Mayumi Kamijo
A temperamental schoolmate the player bumps into on his way to campus and several times thereafter. Their beginning acquaintances are initially bitter and fierce but they gradually warm up to each other and become friends. Mayumi can be a handful with her habitually spitfire personality, however she is kind and sensitive. In spite of her alibis and defense, she can often be found wandering around sex shops downtown.

Remi Himekawa
The vice-president of the student council, often regarded as the most intellectually gifted of school. As the daughter of a multimillionaire business magnate, Remi carries herself with the utmost sophistication, spending most of her time studying in school or at the public library. She takes a genuine interest in the player when his intelligence rises and comes to find that she thoroughly enjoys being around him; a change from the otherwise posh lifestyle she's grown bored of.

Miyuki Tanaka
A shy, soft-spoken girl who enjoys drawing, painting, and is a member of the art club. She is formally introduced to the player through Mikae and takes an interest in him when his concentration in art increases. Though anemic, feeble and sheltered, Miyuki comes to show a much more lecherous, unseen side to herself.

Misako Sayama
A voluptuous and enticing woman who is often found walking around the downtown city area at night. She is a nursing student living off-campus. Her first impression of the player is an endearing one, however frequent workouts and visits to her ultimately get her attention. Her father, a physician, operates the clinic at the player's college and even visits as a fill-in nurse.

Ryoko Shimazaki
A renowned singer-songwriter known by the stage name Sonoko Takahashi. She transfers to Meiai later in the game and joins the player's class, disguised with eyeglasses and new hairstyle, seeking to graduate from college and abandon her much popularized life. An orphan by extension of her parent's death at childhood, Ryoko's brother Tadaaki has since become her promoter and manager.

Arisa Miyoshi
Kazuhiko's peppy younger sister, who at a year younger than him, does not look her age. She attends an all-girl's college and takes a deep admiration for the player when he rescues her from drowning.

Anze
At first encounter, she seems like no more than an ordinary schoolgirl. It is revealed later on, however, that she is actually an angel from Heaven, sent down to Earth by God to retrieve a relic she dropped and lost. As part of her punishment, Anze transforms into a cat after ten days of searching, though this can be stagnated if the player finds the item himself.

Reception

True Love, by most accounts of the game's history, was met with lackluster response in Japan. One reason cited for this is that True Love was the fourteenth release by Parsley, a company that had become known for mediocre quality titles at the time of release. The game's localization, especially in North America, however, was more positive.

References

External links

https://web.archive.org/web/20090122232535/http://parsley.ume.gr.jp/ Official website of the game's developer

1995 video games
Dating sims
Eroge
Visual novels
Bishōjo games
Windows games
NEC PC-9801 games
Video games developed in Japan